Four regiments of the British Army have been numbered the 73rd Regiment of Foot:
 73rd Regiment of Foot (1758), raised by re-designation of 2nd Battalion, 34th Regiment of Foot in 1758 and disbanded in 1763
73rd Regiment of Foot (Invalids), raised as the 116th Regiment of Foot in 1758, re-numbered as the 73rd Regiment of Foot (Invalids) in 1763 and disbanded in 1769
73rd (Highland) Regiment of Foot, raised in 1777 and renumbered as the 71st Regiment of Foot in 1786
73rd (Perthshire) Regiment of Foot, raised as the 2nd Battalion, 42nd Regiment of Foot in 1780, re-numbered as the 73rd (Highland) Regiment of Foot in 1787 and amalgamated in 1881